Feel Right may refer to:

"Feel Right" (Mark Ronson song), 2015
"Feel Right" (Tanya Tucker song), 1982

See also
Feels Right (disambiguation)